Certosa di Pavia railway station is a railway station in Italy. Located on the Milan–Genoa railway, it serves the municipality of Certosa di Pavia.

Services 
The station is served by the line S13 of Milan suburban railway network, operated by the lombard railway company Trenord.

See also 
 Milan suburban railway network
 Certosa di Pavia Monastery

Notes

External links 

Railway stations in Lombardy
Milan S Lines stations